White Skull is an Italian power/heavy metal band formed in 1988.
They became known in America with their 1999 release Tales from the North.

Band members 
The line-up of the band did not change until 1998 when Nick Savio replaced Max Faccio. In 2001, female lead singer Federica de Boni left the band and was replaced by a male lead singer Gustavo Gabarro. Two years later, Fabio Pozzato and Massimo Faccio left the band as well. In 2007, Elisa de Palma became the new singer, with the band becoming female-fronted once again. In 2010, de Boni rejoined the band.

Current members
 Tony "Mad" Fontó - rhythm guitar (1988–present)
 Alex Mantiero - drums (1988–present)
 Federica "Sister" de Boni - lead vocals (1988-2001, 2010–present)
 Valentino Francavilla - lead guitar (2019–present)
 Gio Raddi - bass (2007–present)
 Alessandro Muscio - keyboards (2016-present)

Former members
 Fabio Pozzato - bass (1988-2003)
 Nick Savio - lead guitar (1998-2003)
 Massimo "Max" Faccio - lead guitar (1988-1998)
 Gustavo "Gus" Gabarro - lead vocals (2001-2007)
 Stefano "Steve Bone" Balocco - bass (2003-2007)
 Elisa "Over" de Palma - lead vocals (2007-2010)
 Alessio "Tom" Lucatti - keyboards (2007-2010)
 Danilo Bar - guitar (2003-2019)

Timeline

Discography

Albums 
 1995 – I Won't Burn Alone
 1997 – Embittered
 1999 – Tales from the North
 2000 – Public Glory, Secret Agony
 2002 – The Dark Age
 2004 – The XIII Skull
 2006 – The Ring of the Ancients
 2009 – Forever Fight
 2012 – Under This Flag
 2017 – Will of the Strong
 2022 – Metal Never Rusts

EP 
 1999 – Asgard

Demo 
 1991 - White Skull
 1992 - Save the Planet

References

External links
 The Official White Skull Site
 Myspace page

Musical groups established in 1988
Italian power metal musical groups
Italian heavy metal musical groups
Nuclear Blast artists
Musical quintets